Gonionota bourquiniella is a moth in the family Depressariidae. It was described by Paul Köhler in 1939. It is found in Argentina.

References

Moths described in 1939
Gonionota